Aytaç Ercan (born December 21, 1976) is a Turkish wheelchair basketball player and Paralympian. He is a 4 point player competing for Beşiktaş Wheelchair Basketball Team, and is part of Turkey men's national wheelchair basketball team.

He became a polio victim due to not having been vaccinated as an infant.

Aytaç Ercan played in the national team, which qualified to the 2012 Summer Olympics.

Sporting career
He began with wheelchair basketball playing in 1998 in the Istanbul Youth Disabled Sport Club. Following two champion titles earned in 1999 and 2000, he transferred to Istanbul Fatih Disabled Sport Club. In the beginning of 2003, he became a member of Beşiktaş Wheelchair Basketball Team, and was admitted to the national team. With the foundation of the Galatasaray Wheelchair Basketball Team, Ercan signed with this team, and his team became already in its first season champion in the Second Wheelchair Basketball League. In 2006, Ercan transferred back to Beşiktaş.

Aytaç Ercan was named MVP at the 2002 Malmö Open in Sweden. He became top scorer at an international tournament, and was selected to All Star Team at the 2006 Balkan Cup. Ercan played in the national team, which won the 2011 André Vergauwen Cup.

At the 2012 Summer Paralympics, the national team, he was part of, ranked 7th.

Achievements

References

1976 births
Living people
Galatasaray S.K. (wheelchair basketball) players
Paralympic wheelchair basketball players of Turkey
Sportspeople from Istanbul
Turkish men's wheelchair basketball players
Wheelchair basketball players at the 2012 Summer Paralympics
Beşiktaş JK wheelchair basketball players
People with polio
Centers (basketball)